is a town located in Nemuro Subprefecture, Hokkaido, Japan. As of March 31, 2008, it has an estimated population of 23,958, and an area of 684.98 km2.

Nakashibetsu Airport, the easternmost airport in mainland Japan, is located in the town.

History 
1901 - Division opening of Nakashibetsu area. Development is begun.
July 1, 1946 - The village of Nakashibetsu splits from Shibetsu.
January 1, 1950 - Nakashibetsu Village becomes Nakashibetsu Town.

In 2004, there was an abortive effort to merge Nakashibetsu with the nearby town of Rausu. The new city would have been named "Higashishiretoko", but the plan was defeated in a referendum held in Nakashibetsu.

Climate

References

External links

Official Website 

Towns in Hokkaido